The Jackson Mound is a Native American mound in the south-central portion of the U.S. state of Ohio. The mound has never been excavated, making the certain identification of its builders impossible; however, its location on a high terrace above a relatively small stream suggests that it was built by the Adena culture, which favored such sites for its many mounds. If true, it was originally more conical in shape (the mound's location in a farm field has resulted in its being damaged by years of plowing), and it is likely to cover the remains of a wooden charnel house built by the Adena.

An archaeological survey performed in 1914 listed forty-two different mounds in Fayette County, but the Jackson Mound is the only one that has survived to the present day.  For this reason, it is a significant archaeological site.  In recognition of its archaeological value, it was listed on the National Register of Historic Places in late 1975, being the county's only archaeological site to be accorded this distinction.

References

Adena culture
Archaeological sites on the National Register of Historic Places in Ohio
Geography of Fayette County, Ohio
National Register of Historic Places in Fayette County, Ohio
Mounds in Ohio